A butterfly net (sometimes called an aerial insect net) is one of several kinds of nets used to collect insects.  The entire bag of the net is generally constructed from a lightweight mesh to minimize damage to delicate butterfly wings.  Other types of nets used in insect collecting include beat nets, aquatic nets, and sweep nets. Nets for catching different insects have different mesh sizes. Aquatic nets usually have bigger, more 'open' mesh. Catching small aquatic creatures usually requires an insect net. The mesh is smaller and can capture more.

References 
"Taron, Doug. "Gossamer Tapestry." : Some Thoughts on Butterfly Nets., 10 Apr. 2009. Web. 4 May 2012.

External links
Collecting and Preserving Insects and Mites: Tools and Techniques USDA Very detailed online manual

Nets (devices)
Collecting
Entomology equipment
Butterflies
Environmental Sampling Equipment